Resorts World Hudson Valley is a shopping mall casino in the Newburgh Mall in Newburgh,

History
In the spring of 2022, New York State Governor Kathy Hochul signed off on a budget bill to authorize three downstate casino licenses, allowing retail casino gaming to set up shop in and around New York City. Six months later, the New York State Gaming Commission finalized the roster for the Gaming Facility Location Board, which will ultimately approve and assign licenses to interested parties. With just days remaining in 2022, and a narrow window for VLT location approvals from the New York State Facility Location Board, the Genting Group, with electronic casinos in Queens, New York, and Monticello, New York. opened its new location in the Newburgh Mall.

Opening 

On December 28, 2022, after 50 million dollars in renovations, the Malaysian-based Genting Group Resorts World Hudson Valley Casino, occupying 50 thousand square feet, featuring over 1200 slot machines and video lottery terminals (only the ninth official video lottery facility in New York State), and electronic 82 table games, opened in the Newburgh Mall at the site of the former The Bon-Ton Department Stores in the Newburgh Mall. The arrangement also includes a three million dollar annual payment by the Genting Group to the Town of Newburgh for the rights to host the casino in the township, which includes an annual 500 thousand dollar payment to Newburgh enhance police, fire and ambulance services, according to the Times-herald Record newspaper. The video lottery terminals were previously operated by the Genting Group at Monticello Raceway as a racino. The track remains open, but racino was later closed when the Genting Group opened Resorts World Catskills Casino in Monticello, New York.

The Newburgh Mall, more than 25 percent vacant since 2009, faced foreclosure in 2012. After operating in foreclosure for several years, the mall was sold at a foreclosure sale for $10 to the holder of its mortgage, Wells Fargo. In 2017 the mall was sold for $7.7 million. Its anchor stores were the former Bon-Ton Department Store, and Sears, which departed the Newburgh Mall as the last Sears store in New York State on October 16, 2022, after 43 years. It features 65 speciality stores.

Resorts World Hudson Valley Casino brings 250 new full-time jobs to the Newburgh area with an average annual wage of $72,000, according to a casino spokesperson, with hiring priority to Newburgh residents. In addition, the casino operates a special exclusive VIP Club for verified Newburgh residents only. The new casino will contribute an estimated $65 million in taxes every year to support New York State public schools, casino executives noted. To date, Resorts World properties throughout the state have contributed more than $3.6 billion to the public education in New York State.

“The casino will also provide a halo effect inside of the mall property it inhabits, playing a crucial role in a revitalization plan to benefit current tenants at the Newburgh Mall and attract new ones,” a spokesperson for the casino said in a written statement. Resorts World Hudson Valley is Genting’s third entertainment destination in New York, joining Resorts World Catskills in Monticello and Resorts World New York City in Queens. Across its three properties, Genting has invested more than $1.2 billion in New York State infrastructure across its three casino properties.

References

External links
 

2022 establishments in New York (state)
Buildings and structures in Orange County, New York
Casinos in New York (state)
Tourist attractions in Orange County, New York